H. Percy Thompson was a Canadian businessman and professional ice hockey executive. He was the part-owner and manager of the Hamilton Tigers team in the National Hockey League.

In 1920, Thompson was a partner in the 'Abso-Pure Ice Company' of Hamilton, Ontario, which had built the Barton Street Arena. After being approached by competing interests interested in setting up a professional ice hockey team in Hamilton, Abso-Pure and Thompson paid $5000 to Frank Calder, the president of the NHL to purchase the Quebec Bulldogs franchise. The payment was made directly to Frank Calder, not the NHL.

Thompson would remain manager of the team until it was dissolved in the fall of 1925, after the team's players had been sold to the New York Americans and the franchise revoked by the NHL. He would continue as part-owner of the Hamilton Tigers minor league team until 1930, when it was sold to become the Syracuse Stars. He also coached the minor league team from 1926 until 1928.

NHL coaching record

References

 

Hamilton Tigers (ice hockey)
Ice hockey people from Ontario